Dominic Abui Pretino (born 1 January 1991) is a South Sudanese footballer who plays as a forward.

International career

International goals
Scores and results list South Sudan's goal tally first.

References

External links 
 

1991 births
Living people
Association football forwards
People with acquired South Sudanese citizenship
South Sudanese footballers
South Sudan international footballers
Al Khartoum SC players
Al Ahli SC (Khartoum) players